The Amarna Era  includes the reigns of Akhenaten, Smenkhkare, Tutankhamun and Ay. The period is named after the capital city established by Akhenaten, son of Amenhotep III. Akhenaten started his reign as Amenhotep IV, but changed his name when he discarded all other religions and declared the Aten or sun disc as the only god. He closed all the temples of the other Gods and removed their names from the monuments. Smenkhkare, then Tutankhamun, succeeded Akhenaten. Discarding Akhenten's religious beliefs, Tutankhamun returned to the traditional gods. He died young and was succeeded by Ay. Many kings did their best to remove all traces of the period from the records. The Amarna art is very distinctive: the royal family was portrayed with extended heads, long necks and narrow chests. They had skinny limbs, but heavy hips and thighs, with a marked stomach.

Kings in the Amarna period

Akhenaten 
Akhenaten started his reign as the king of Egypt around 1353 BC. The reign of his father, Amenhotep III, had been long and wealthy with international diplomacy largely replacing the persistent military campaigning of the kings before him. The reign ended in a series of wonderful anniversary pageants celebrated in Thebes, the capital of Egypt at the time and home to the official god Amun-Re. The new king was named as Amenhotep IV (meaning 'Amun is content') and temple construction began immediately in the name of the new king. Akhenaten's 'great king's wife' was Nefertiti and they had six daughters. There were also other wives, including the enigmatic Kiya who may have been the mother of Tutankhamun.

Smenkhkare 
Smenkhkare was a king (reigned 1335–32 bce) in the 18th Dynasty of ancient Egypt. Smenkhkare's beginning and identity from the vague issues of the Amarna period. The short-lived Smenkhkare appears only at the end of Ahkenaton's reign in a few monuments at Amarna. He shares the same coronation name, Ankhkheperure, with another royal individual called Neferneferuaton. Since coronation names are generally exceptional to one individual, it has been suggested that Smenkhkare is Nefertiti herself, raised herself to kingly status to share the throne with her husband at the end of his life. In one tomb at Akhetaton, Smenkhkare is shown with the eldest daughter of Akhenaton, Meritaten, then elevated to the status of queen. The only dated document of Smenkhkare's reign is a graffito from a Theban tomb, which notes his third regnal year.

Tutankhamun 
Tutankhamun was born during the Amarna period. The identity of his parents is doubtful but they were perhaps Akhenaten and his wife Kiya; he was a royal prince and began his reign at the age of about eight years. Tutankhamun married Ankhesenpaaten, daughter of Akhenaten and Nefertiti. Tutankhamun, the 11th king of the 18th dynasty of Ancient Egypt, is famous due to the discovery of tomb by the British archaeologist Howard Carter in 1922. The discovery of his mummy shown that he was about 17 when he died. He is thought to have been the son of Akhenaten. When Tutankhamun began his reign, his management restored the old religion and moved the capital from Akhetaten back to its traditional home at Memphis. He changed his name from Tutankhaten—'living image of Aten [the sun god]'—to Tutankhamun. His queen, Ankhesenpaaten, also changed the name on her throne to read Ankhesenamun. Although the reign of Tutankhamun is thought to have little historical importance, his monuments tell a different story. He built his tomb in the Valley of the Kings, and one colossal statue still survives of the mortuary temple he began to build at Medinet Habu. He also continued building at the temple of Karnak and finished the second of a pair of red granite lions at Soleb. Doubt still surrounds his death. He may have been killed, or died as the result of an injury happened while hunting.

Royal women in the Amarna period

Nefertiti 
Nefertiti, whose name means "the beautiful one has come," was the queen of Egypt and wife of king Akhenaten. She and her husband established the religion of Aten, and promoted Egyptian art that was very different. Nefertiti was one of the most iconic symbols of Egypt. Little is known about the origins of Nefertiti, but her legacy of beauty and power continue to intrigue scholars today. Other theories have suggested that she was born in a foreign country. The exact date when Nefertiti married Amenhotep IV, is unknown. It is believed she was 15 which may have been before Akhenaten began his reign. They had six daughters, with rumor that they may have also had a son. Art from the day depicts the couple and their daughters in an unusually naturalistic style, more so than from earlier art. It has been stated that the couple may have had a genuine romantic connection. Nefertiti and the king took an active role in establishing the religion of the Aten as the most important god and only one worthy of worship in Egypt. Amenhotep IV changed his name to Akhenaten to honor the God. Nefertiti changed her name to Neferneferuaten-Nefertiti, meaning "beautiful are the beauties of Aten, a beautiful woman has come," as a respect for the new religion. Nefertiti was perhaps one of the most powerful women that have ever ruled. Her husband has done a lot to show her as equal to him. In several reliefs she is shown wearing the crown of a king. She disappears after year 17 of her husband's reign. The reason for her disappearance is unknown.

Religion in the Amarna period 
The Egyptians used to have a whole list of Gods who were worshipped during this period of time. These Gods were always represented in the form of humans or animals or as animal-headed humans. Some of these gods were specific to certain places or cities for example while others were more general and were worshipped on a larger scale. From early periods of the Egyptian kingdom solar gods such as Re had played a very important role in Egyptian state religion. This is mainly because the idea of the sun as a distant yet universal power was close enough to the prevailing ideas of the supreme power of the king both inside Egypt and beyond its borders. In the New Kingdom, the prominence and power of solar gods increased again. One of the most popular ones was the Aten, the visible sun-disk which can be seen traversing the sky each day.  Akhenaten raised the Aten to the position of 'sole god', and it was represented as a disk with rays of light terminating in hands which reach out to the royal family, it was usually perceived as if it was offering the hieroglyphic sign for life. Akhenaten and his family are usually displayed while worshipping the Aten or even indulging in everyday activities beneath the disk that represents Aten. Art and test during this period always stressed on the idea of the tie between the king and the God. The king represents the link between the god and ordinary people. As a result, ordinary people had to focus on worshipping Akhenaten and the royal family instead of the Aten. And with worshipping the king they are getting closer to the god Aten. 

A number of hymns to the Aten were composed during Akhenaten's reign in order to praise the Aten. These hymns provide an overview of what James Allen has described as the 'natural philosophy' of Akhenaten's religion. The wonders of the natural world are described to praise the universal power of the sun. All creatures celebrate when the sun rises and the nature becomes beautiful. While nasty things happen = at night when the sun is not present. Akhenaten decided that the worship of the Aten required a new location which is uncontaminated by the cults of traditional gods. That's why; he chose a site in Middle Egypt for a new capital city which he called Akhetaten, 'Horizon of the Aten'. It is a faraway site in the desert surrounded on three sides by cliffs and to the west by the Nile and is known today as el-Amarna. In the cliffs surrounding the city the king left a series of monumental inscriptions in which he explained his reasons for the move to this new site and his architectural intentions for the city in the form of lists of buildings that he either built or intended to build.

Art in the Amarna period 

Early in his reign, Akhenaten used art in order to emphasize his intentions of doing things very differently unlike his precedents. Colossi and wall-reliefs from the Karnak Aten Temple are highly exaggerated and almost grotesque when compared to the Egyptian royal and elite art during the millennium preceding Akhenaten's birth. Art before Akhenaten was characterized by its formality and restraint. Since art during Akhenaten period such as Karnak Temple is strangely beautiful today, it is hard for us to understand the shocking effect that such representations must have had on the senses of people who were never exposed to any similar art before. It was quite striking for them to find such extravagant art after being used to the traditional formal Egyptian art. With the move to Amarna, art becomes less exaggerated, it is often described as 'naturalistic' however, it remains highly stylized in its portrayal of the human figure. The royal family members are usually shown with elongated skulls and pear-shaped bodies with skinny torsos and arms but fuller hips, stomachs and thighs. Although formal worshipping scenes of the king while worshipping the Gods remain important, there was an increase emphasis on ordinary, day-to-day activities. Some of the very interesting portrayals were those intimate portrayals of Akhenaten and Nefertiti while playing with their daughters under the rays of the Aten. Also, there were portrayals of animals and birds playing under the sun rays in the decoration of the royal tomb. While traditional Egyptian art tends to emphasize the idea of eternity, Amarna art focuses on the small details of life which only occur because of the light of the sun that gives the living power to all living beings. Not only Akhenaten is famous for the changes he made in the religious practices and art but he also was known for the changes in temple architecture and building methods. He shifted to smaller blocks of stone set in a strong mortar in order to create his stone structure. Even official inscriptions changed from the old-fashioned language used in traditional earlier periods to monumental texts to reflect the spoken language of the time.

See also
 Amarna Period

References

Ancient Egypt